An Evergreen Christmas is a 2014 American holiday independent film written by Jeremy Culver and Morgen Culver and directed by Jeremy Culver as Culver’s first narrative feature. The film stars Charleene Closshey, Robert Loggia, Naomi Judd, Tyler Ritter, Booboo Stewart, Greer Grammer and Jake Sandvig and is set in the fictional town of Balsam Falls, Tennessee. Principal photography began in Charlotte, NC February 2013. The film released direct to DVD on November 4, 2014 with premiere theater screenings in Nashville, TN and Tampa, FL. The film was available on Netflix for 38 months from December 20, 2014 until January 21, 2018. The film is rated PG.

Cast
Main
 Charleene Closshey as Evergreen “Evie” Lee
 Robert Loggia as “Pops”
 Naomi Judd as Miss Honey
 Tyler Ritter as Adam Milloy
 Booboo Stewart as Angel Velenquez
 Greer Grammer as Annabelle Jones
 Jake Sandvig as Chez Walsh
Supporting
 Brantley Pollock as Thomas
 Tiz McWilliams as Becky Tamora
 Jesse Moore as Joe
 Sal Lopez as Jose Velenquez
 Dyana Ortelli as Rosie Velenquez
 Alex Van as Jacob Jones
 Skyler Stonestreet as Babette
Additional
 Don Hartman as the Inspector
 Russell Cook as Owen Lee
 Jonathan Bedford as the Shepherd DJ
 Charles Closshey as Pat

Reception
The film received mixed reviews.

Reviewer Donna Rolfe of The Dove Foundation called the holiday movie "charming", further adding the film "is a heartwarming story about living your dreams and not just chasing them. Many children have moved away from their homes to places they thought may be better, only to find out there is no place better than where they grew up to find their dreams."

In her review for Common Sense Media, Renee Schonfeld rated An Evergreen Christmas two stars from five, concluding: ... "Ms. Closshey, recognized as a talented musician, wrote the music, participated in the filmmaking, and clearly wants to add acting to her résumé; it’s an adequate effort. Overall it's an OK but uninspired film for older kids and teens that's unlikely to inspire multiple viewings."

See also 
 List of Christmas films

References

External links
 
 
 
 
 An Evergreen Christmas

2014 films
2014 romantic comedy films
2010s Christmas films
Films set in 2014
Films set in Tennessee
Films shot in North Carolina
American Christmas films
American romantic comedy films
2010s English-language films
2010s American films